Capital MetroRail is a hybrid rail (light rail with some features similar to commuter rail) line that serves the Greater Austin area in Texas, and which is owned by Capital Metro. The Red Line, Capital Metro's first and only rail line, connects Downtown Austin with Austin's northern suburbs.

After a series of delays, Capital MetroRail was inaugurated in March 2010.  Daily ridership during the first nine months was approximately 800 riders per weekday, although it had doubled to 1,600 by its first anniversary. Capital Metro added additional runs during midday beginning in mid-January 2011. Capital Metro added Friday evening and Saturday afternoon and evening regularly scheduled service on March 23, 2012.

History 
Advocates of modern urban rail began calling on the city of Austin to develop a passenger rail system at the height of the 1970s energy crisis. When voters approved Capital Metro's creation in 1985, the agency was seen not only as the new operator of local bus services, but the developer of a future passenger rail as well. The next year, Capital Metro partnered with the City of Austin to purchase the  Giddings-to-Llano Austin and Northwestern Railroad (on which the Red Line currently operates) from the Southern Pacific Transportation Company with the express purpose of someday operating passenger rail on it. The purchase price was $9.3 million, of which $6 million came from a grant from the Federal Transit Administration, $0.6 million came from the City of Austin and $2.7 million came from Capital Metro. On May 20, 1998, Capital Metro acquired the City of Austin's share in the railroad for $1 million.

During the 1990s, Capital Metro faced persistent bad publicity that resulted from dysfunctional management and poor accountability. After years of inaction on passenger rail, the Texas Legislature in 1997 stepped in and ordered the public transport provider to hold an up-or-down referendum on light rail. In response, Capital Metro drew up an ambitious plan for a $1.9 billion,  system that included a north-south Red Line and an east-west Green Line.

The 2000 proposal was narrowly defeated by 2,000 votes, with most of central Austin voting in favor and suburban and exurban areas within the service area voting against the referendum. Capital Metro came back in 2004 with a significantly scaled-down version of its 2000 plan that it hoped voters in Travis County and Williamson County would find more palatable. The 2004 version was approved by 62% of voters in the service area. MetroRail was presented to voters as part of the All Systems Go Long-Range Transit Plan, which also included expanded local and express bus service. The Red Line, originally known as the Downtown/Northwest Urban Commuter Rail Service line, approved by voters was seen as a starter line that would become part of a potential comprehensive passenger rail system in the Greater Austin area. The corridor was chosen for the first line after Capital Metro's Board identified the following areas as probable areas for future growth: the Highland Mall area, the master-planned Mueller Community redevelopment project, as well as the central business district, extending from the University of Texas at Austin to Lady Bird Lake.

The organization at the time said they could have the system built by 2008 for a cost of $60 million, and borrow $30 million for six train cars to be paid back over a period of years. About $30 million of that cost, they said, would come from the federal government. However, Capital Metro never officially sought the federal money and revealed in 2010 it has spent $105 million on the system's construction, not $90 million as originally suggested. Additionally, the original 2008 launch date for Capital MetroRail was postponed two years due to multiple safety and construction issues.

Service on Capital MetroRail finally began on March 22, 2010, because of safety issues and construction delays. On December 9, 2009, Capital Metro terminated its contract with Veolia Transport and renegotiated a contract with Herzog Transit Services.

On June 26, 2014, TxDOT awarded CapMetro with a $50 million grant for the purchase of four new rail cars, which is anticipated to double capacity, and for general improvements to the Downtown MetroRail station.

Downtown Gateway Station 
By 2015, CapMetro had taken the first steps in the planning of a permanent downtown station. Although the estimates for cost of the proposed terminal were $30–35 million, $22 million of this sum came directly from a Texas Department of Transportation grant awarded to CapMetro in 2014. Proponents of the station asserted that it will not only alleviate the congestion problems associated with the current downtown MetroRail terminal, but also serve as a cultural hub wherein future residents and visitors can easily access a number of current and potential amenities, including but not limited, to additional transit systems, shopping, and recreational activities. The new permanent Downtown station opened on October 19, 2020.

Operation 

The Capital MetroRail system currently consists of the Red Line,  of track that connects Leander and the Austin Convention Center in Downtown Austin. The line also passes through Cedar Park, northwest Austin, north-central Austin, and east Austin. The annual cost to operate the Red Line is $14.3 million.

On January 18, 2011, Capital Metro added 13 additional midday trains to the previously limited schedule, as well as increased runs during peak hours. Additionally, the organization will run trains on a regular schedule Friday and Saturday starting March 23, 2012. In addition to the normal Friday schedule, trains will run hourly from 7:00pm to 12:00am and every 35 minutes from 4:00pm to 12:00am on Saturday. Prior to the regularly scheduled Friday and Saturday service Capital Metro ran weekend service for special events, such as the SXSW festival.

Red Line 
Currently the Capital MetroRail system only consists of the Red Line, which is alternately designated as Route 550 on internal Capital Metro documents. Its northern terminus is the Leander Station and Park & Ride and the southern terminus is the Downtown (Convention Center) Station. Each station features an accessible platform with varying canopy designs, ticket vending machines (TVM), bike racks, and informational displays. Its nine stations were constructed largely along existing freight rail tracks in cooperation with the City of Austin following a transit-oriented development (TOD) plan intended to encourage use of public transportation by developing mixed-use residential and commercial areas around the stations. Frequencies are expected to improve to 15 minutes after double tracking is completed between Lakeline and Leander. The following Red Line stations are listed north to south:

Though trains are available past midnight on Fridays and Saturdays, the last train leaving downtown Monday through Thursday is at 7:20pm.

Rolling stock 

In September 2005, Stadler Rail won a bid to build six Stadler GTW diesel-electric light regional railcars for the system. Each of the vehicle's capital costs is about $6 million, and they run on 2 x 375 kW (510 Hp) = 750 kW (1020 Hp) diesel-electric engines. In 2017, Capital Metro received 4 new GTW trainsets from Stadler for the MetroRail Red Line. These new trains expanded the fleet from 6 to 10 units, and allowed Capital Metro to increase the frequency of the Red Line. The new trains feature a slightly tweaked paint scheme (to better match the MetroBus paint scheme), LED destination displays instead of the flip-dot displays found on the older units, and an updated engine car design that features a rounded top rather than the angled top found on the older units. The units originally purchased in 2005 are numbered #101-106 and the newer units purchased in 2014 are numbered #201-204.

The vehicles have a capacity of 200 passengers, 108 seated and 92 standing. The trains have priority seating areas (fully ADA compliant) for wheelchair users. A "VIP section" with room for laptop use with WiFi access is also included. Bike racks, luggage racks, high back racks, and low floor entry for easy access are all features of what Capital Metro calls the safest and most technologically advanced trains in North America. WiFi is provided by cellular based 3G service. Capital Metro is currently researching upgrading access to 4G speeds, but is dependent on the cell carrier offering a commercial grade product that will work in Capital Metro's devices.  For safety, the vehicles have ten cameras outside and six inside, as well as a sophisticated communications system.

Planned expansions 

Any potential expansion would require another referendum in the Capital Metro service area to secure funding. Capital Metro's All Systems Go Plan includes a study into potential future service. Below are a few expansions which are either in the planning process or otherwise being actively considered.

Passing tracks 
Construction is currently underway on a new passing siding between Park St. and Discovery Blvd. along the northernmost portion of the Red Line in Leander. This siding, along with various other improvements, will allow the Red Line to run 15-minute frequencies for the first time in its history, more than doubling the current maximum frequency of ~37 minutes. Construction on the siding is expected to be completed in early 2023.

MoKan Corridor 
Capital Metro has plans to build a new rail line along the abandoned "MoKan" railway line, which is owned by TXDot, to Georgetown, Round Rock, and Pflugerville.

MetroRail Red Line additional stations 
As part of Project Connect, Capital Metro has proposed building 2 new stations along the Red Line, at McKalla Place (adjacent to the new Austin FC soccer stadium), and at Broadmoor (The Domain). These would replace the existing Kramer station.

Capital Metro Green Line 

In September 2008, Capital Metro evaluated the need for rail service to alleviate pressure from congestion downtown to Colony Park, with a potential extension to Elgin. To fix this problem, CapMetro decided to plan for adding another rail line to their service, or the Green Line. The Green Line would operate with similar service characteristics as the Red Line, as it would also run on existing freight tracks with adjustments made to them to allow for passenger rail service.

Trains would depart the Red Line and begin to head east in between the Red Line stations MLK Jr. and Plaza Saltillo, where the first stop would be Pleasant Valley; more new stations will be at Springdale, East US 183, Loyola/Johnny Morris, and Colony Park. A potential future extension beyond Colony Park with new stations at Wildhorse, Manor, and Elgin. The Green Line will be built from Downtown to Colony Park first, with the extension to Elgin considered at a later time. In December 2008, a presentation, and then a follow-up, were given to the CAMPO Transit Work Group about the Green Line. In May 2018, the Travis County Commissioners Court voted 3–2 to move forward with a viability study of the Green Line.

Capital Metro Orange Line 

A contract was approved for the Orange Line on March 20, 2019. The Orange Line is a planned  light rail line that will run in its own dedicated transitway, which will allow it to bypass the traffic that plagues the corridor it follows. The Orange Line will operate from North Lamar Transit Center to Stassney & Congress, and will follow the current route of the 801 or a similar alignment. The stations will be North Lamar Transit Center, Crestview (where a transfer to the Red Line will be possible), Koenig, Triangle, Hyde Park (38th), Hemphill Park (29th), UT West Mall (24th), Capitol West, Government Center, Republic Square, Auditorium Shores, SoCo, Oltorf, St. Edward's, South Congress Transit Center, and Stassney. A potential future extension north to Tech Ridge and south to Slaughter is being considered. The new stations would be at Tech Ridge, Parmer, Braker, Rundberg, William Cannon, and Slaughter. In 2020, the planned route was truncated in length to reduce construction costs, with bus bridges providing connectivity through the rest of the corridor.

Capital Metro Blue Line 

The Blue Line is a planned  light rail line that will operate from North Lamar Transit Center to Austin–Bergstrom International Airport. It will follow the Orange Line's route from North Lamar Transit Center to Republic Square, and will follow the current route of MetroBus route 20 or a similar alignment to Austin–Bergstrom International Airport. New stations will be North Lamar Transit Center, Crestview (where a transfer to the Red Line will be possible), Koenig, Triangle, Hyde Park (38th), Hemphill Park (29th), UT West Mall (24th), Capitol West, Government Center, Republic Square, Downtown Station, Macc/Rainey, Waterfront, Travis Heights, Lakeshore, Riverside, Faro, Montopolis, Metrocenter, and Austin–Bergstrom International Airport.

Capital Metro Gold Line 

The Gold Line is a planned  bus rapid transit line that would operate from ACC Highland to the South Congress Transit Center park-and-ride, and will travel on Airport, Red River, San Jacinto/Trinity, 7th/8th, Neches/Red River, 4th, Riverside, and South Congress. Stations will be ACC Highland, Clarkson, Hancock, St. David's, UT East, Medical School, Capitol East, Trinity, Downtown Station (where transfer to the Red, Green, or Blue Lines will be possible), Republic Square, Auditorium Shores, SoCo (South Congress), Oltorf, St. Edward's, and South Congress Transit Center. The Gold Line was changed to light rail in May 2020, citing a demographic that showed an increased projected ridership along the gold line that prompted its conversion to  light rail. In July 2020, planning for the line was reverted to bus service to lower construction costs in response to the economic crisis caused by the COVID-19 pandemic.

See also 

 Tram-train
 Commuter rail in North America
 List of United States commuter rail systems by ridership
 List of rail transit systems in the United States
 Stadler GTW

References

External links 

Capital Metro: All Systems Go Long-Range Transit Plan

Capital Metro
Light rail in Texas
Passenger rail transportation in Texas
Rail transportation in Austin, Texas
Commuter rail in the United States
Transportation in Williamson County, Texas
Transportation in Travis County, Texas
Railway lines opened in 2010